The Lifeboat Monument, St Annes, stands on South Promenade, St Annes, Fylde, Lancashire, England.  It commemorates the death of 13 lifeboatmen from St Annes who were lost in the attempt to rescue the crew of the German barque Mexico that had been driven into a sandbank in a gale in December 1886. The lifeboat from Southport also lost 14 of its 16 man crew in the disaster. The monument depicts a lifeboatman looking out to sea and standing on a rock-like plinth.  It is recorded in the National Heritage List for England as a designated Grade II listed building.

History

In a severe gale on 9 December 1886, the Mexico, a German barque, was driven on to the Horse Bank, a sandbank off Ainsdale, near Southport.  Three lifeboats were launched to come to her rescue, Laura Janet from St Annes, Eliza Fernley from Southport, and Charles Biggs from Lytham.  The crew from the Mexico were rescued by the Lytham lifeboat, but the other two lifeboats capsized.  All thirteen of the crew of the St Annes lifeboat were lost, and only two of the sixteen members of the Southport lifeboat crew survived.  It was the worst disaster in the history of the Royal National Lifeboat Institution.

Following the disaster, John Unwin, the mayor of Southport, set up a Disaster Fund, which raised £31,000.  Most of this was used to help the dependants of the men lost, but in January 1887 the Fund allowed each of the three local committees a sum of £200 to erect monuments to commemorate the disaster.  The St Annes committee commissioned W. B. Rhind to design a monument.  This was unveiled on St Annes Promenade on 23 May 1888 by John Talbot Clifton.

Description

The monument is constructed in sandstone. Standing on the pedestal is a larger than life-size figure of a lifeboatman. The lifeboatman looks out to sea. On the south side of the monument is a panel inscribed with the names of those who were lost. Underneath the names is the following inscription:

Appraisal

The memorial was designated as a Grade II listed building on 15 February 1993.  Grade II is the lowest of the three grades of listing and is applied to "buildings of national importance and special interest".

Related monuments

Three other memorials were commissioned to commemorate the event, two in Southport and one in Lytham, all of which are designated at Grade II.  In Southport Cemetery is the Lifeboat Memorial, which is in the form of a tomb chest, and on the Promenade is the Monumental Obelisk, which commemorates other events in addition to the lifeboat disaster.  The Lytham Memorial stands in the churchyard of St Cuthbert's Church and has the form of a pinnacled tabernacle.

See also

Listed buildings in Saint Anne's on the Sea
Southport and St Anne's lifeboats disaster
Stone Sermons: Monuments, Memory and the Mexico Disaster

References

Citations

Sources

 

 
 
 

Grade II listed buildings in Lancashire
Buildings and structures completed in 1888
Monuments and memorials in Lancashire
Lytham St Annes
Grade II listed monuments and memorials
Buildings and structures in the Borough of Fylde